Kualakaʻi station (also known as East Kapolei station) is an under construction Honolulu Rail Transit station in East Kapolei, Hawaii. It is expected to serve as the western terminus of the initial system when operations commence in 2022. When finished, it will have 900 park and ride spaces.

The Hawaiian Station Name Working Group proposed Hawaiian names for the nine rail stations on the Ewa end of the rail system (stations west of and including Aloha Stadium) in November 2017, and HART adopted the proposed names on February 22, 2018.

References

External links
 

Honolulu Rail Transit stations
Railway stations scheduled to open in 2023